Richthofen most commonly refers to Manfred von Richthofen (1892–1918), a fighter pilot with the German Air Force during World War I.

Richthofen may also refer to:

People 
 Bolko von Richthofen (1899–1983), German archaeologist
 Emil von Richthofen (1810–1895), Prussian baron and diplomat
 Ferdinand von Richthofen (1833–1905), German traveller, geographer, and scientist
 Hermann von Richthofen (1933-2021), German diplomat
 Lothar von Richthofen (1894–1922), German First World War fighter ace
 Oswald von Richthofen (1847–1906), German diplomat and politician
Wolfram Freiherr von Richthofen (1895–1945), German military officer and aviator
 Else von Richthofen (1874–1973), German social scientist
 The Richthofen family, a prominent German aristocratic family
 Suzane von Richthofen (born 1983), Brazilian murderer

Other uses 
 Richthofen (film), a 1927 German silent war film directed by Desider Kertesz and Peter Joseph
 Mount Richthofen, a summit in the Rocky Mountains in Colorado
 Richthofen Castle, a mansion in Denver, Colorado
 Richthofen Pass, a mountain pass in Graham Land, Antarctica
 Richthofen Range, former name of the Qilian Mountains, China
 Molly von Richthofen, a character in The Punisher comic books